Shackelford Branch is a stream in Ray County in the U.S. state of Missouri. It is a tributary of the Fishing River.

Shackelford Branch has the last name of Jim and John Shackleford, original owners of the site.

See also
List of rivers of Missouri

References

Rivers of Ray County, Missouri
Rivers of Missouri